Bernice is a ghost town in Churchill County, in the U.S. state of Nevada.

History
Variant names were "Casket" and "Caskett". A post office called Casket was established in 1882, the name was changed to Bernice in 1883, and the post office closed in 1894. Different dates are given in Gamett & Paher, as cited by the GNIS, which states that the post office was called Casket from June 1882 until January 1883 and then Bernice from July 1883 to June 1884. According to tradition, "Bernice" was the name of a miner's love interest.

External links 
 Bernice (forgottennevada.com) - includes a number of newspaper articles.

References

Ghost towns in Churchill County, Nevada
Ghost towns in Nevada
Geography of Churchill County, Nevada